Cassiane Santana Santos Macnhães Guimarães (born January 27, 1973) is a Brazilian gospel singer, songwriter and Christian minister. She is known mononymously as Cassiane.  She has been singing for over 40 years.

History
Cassiane was born January 27, 1973. Cassiane was born in a Christian home in the municipality of Nova Iguaçu, Baixada Fluminense (RJ). At three years old she sang in worship with family support. 

In 1981 the singer recorded her first album (an LP) at 8 years of age. She married in 1994 to Jairinho Manhães. They have 3 children, Jayane, Caius and Joshua. Cassiane Jairinho and recorded together for the album "Love You". Once residing in Ilha do Governador, Rio de Janeiro.

She has recorded 17 musical works including "No Words" - gold album (1996), "Forever" - platinum (1998), "With Much Praise" - Diamond Disc (1999 ), "Reward" disc platinaduplo (2001), "The Cure", platinum (2003), "Seeds of Faith" - disk platinaduplo (2006) and "Make a Difference" (2007). 

In 2005, Cassiane was named the first pastor for her church. The singer was nominated in several categories at Promises Trophy in 2011, among them best song ("I shall"), Best CD (Viva) and best singer.

Discography

Albums

Video albums

References

External links

 

1972 births
Living people
Brazilian gospel singers
People from Nova Iguaçu
Brazilian Christians
Christian music songwriters
21st-century Brazilian singers
21st-century Brazilian women singers